Servare et Manere is a Slovak non-profit organization and grassroots activity, which was founded in 2010 and has a Special Consultative Status within the Economic and Social Council of the United Nations (UN ECOSOC).

History 

The organization was founded with the intention of protecting and restoring the cultural heritage of Slovakia. Following the establishment of the International Tree of Peace initiative, Servare et Manere is currently focusing on spreading the message of friendship between nations and peace through the planting of memorial trees. Servare et Manere is a strictly apolitical organization and one of its co-founders is Dr. Marek Sobola, a heraldic artist and landscape architect. The organization has signed a Memorandum of understanding with the Japanese World Peace Bell Association. One of the Peace Bells is also installed in front of the Secretariat Building at the United Nations Headquarters. The organization also places great emphasis on protecting and maintaining the cleanliness of the environment, which is a fundamental pillar of peace. In 2022, the original constitution of the organization was revised. Through the Tree of Peace initiative, Servare et Manere also contributes to the fulfillment of the sustainable development goals of the 2030 Agenda in Slovakia and in the partner countries.

Awards 
Servare et Manere has also established two international peace awards and one honourable mention. By 2022, the organization's awards had been accepted by a number of laureates, including heads of state, government officials, or members of royal families and ecclesiastical dignitaries. Servare et Manere currently grants:

Regular awards 
 Tree of Peace Memorial Plaque (highest award)
  Memorial Medal of Tree of Peace
 Friend of Peace (honourable mention)

Occasional awards 

 Tree of Peace Around the World Commemorative Medal. An Award established as a reminder of the Tree of Peace expedition around the world in 2022.

Notable projects

Tree of Peace 
Slovak international initiative. The project, created on the occasion of the 100th anniversary of the end of World War I, was initiated by the Servare et Manere Secretary-General. The main goal of the initiative is to promote a message of peace by planting a Tree of Peace on every continent. The project is claimed to aim at planting trees around the globe to draw awareness to the global environmental issue and to enhance the solidarity of the humankind. This tree of understanding and friendship among nations represents Slovakia under the official state brand “GOOD IDEA SLOVAKIA – IDEAS FROM SLOVAKIA” and is implemented by Servare et Manere with the support of the Ministry of Foreign and European Affairs of the Slovak Republic.

World Map of Peace 
The World Map of Peace (World Peace Map) as a project joins all individual plantings of Trees of Peace in different countries of the world and gives them a clear goal: to involve as many countries as possible in the planting of Peace Trees and thus gradually supplement the World Peace Map. The Map was created symbolically on Earth Day on April 22, 2021 in Slovakia by the symbolic planting of Bunge's pine in Carl Gustav Swensson Park in Žilina.

Statue of St. John of Nepomuk in Divina 
Local project for the restoration of cultural heritage of Slovakia with an international dimension. The reconstructed Statue of St. John of Nepomuk in Divina was uncovered by Joachim Bleicker, the Ambassador of the Federal Republic of Germany in Slovakia together with Emil Molko, Mayor of Divina and the author of the project, Marek Sobola. Subsequently, it was blessed by Mons. Tomáš Galis, Bishop of Žilina. Besides the Bishop, Ambassador of Germany and the Head of the Bishop Office, the ceremony was attended also by invited partners. In addition to Slovakia, partners from Germany, Cambodia, Bulgaria, the Czech Republic and the Vatican City have joined the reconstruction project.

Carl Gustav Swensson Memorial in Žilina (CGS) 

The largest memorial dedicated to Swedish landscape architect Carl Gustav Swensson in the world and in Europe is located in the park of the same name in Žilina, Slovakia. At the initiative of Servare et Manere, the town of Žilina decided to finance the Carl Gustav Swensson Memorial, which the NGO also built. The CGS is located in a park with the same name. The Memorial project was carried out under the official auspices of the Embassy of the Kingdom of Sweden in Vienna.  The authors of the CGS are Marek Sobola and Michal Janiga. On 3 November 2021 in Swensson Park in Žilina, Servare et Manere planted under the British Embassy in Bratislava patronage the very first Her Majesty's Platinum Jubilee Tree in Central Europe. The planting was personally attended by Nigel Baker , British Ambassador to Slovakia. The Slovak Platinum Jubilee Tree has thus become an inspiration for similar planting initiatives outside the United Kingdom and the Commonwealth.

References 

Non-governmental organizations
Non-profit organisations based in Slovakia
International awards
Peace awards
Peace symbols
2010 establishments in Slovakia